Tom Walsh (birth unknown – death unknown), also known by the nickname of "Tot", was a professional rugby league footballer who played in the 1930s, 1940s and 1950s. He played at club level for Leigh (Heritage No. 383), Castleford (Heritage № 159), and Dewsbury (World War II guest), as a goal-kicking , i.e. number 7.

Playing career

Championship final appearances
Tom Walsh played  in Dewsbury's 14-25 aggregate defeat by Wigan in the Championship Final during the 1943–44 season; Walsh played , and scored a try, and 3-goals (1-goal, and 2-penalty goals) in the 9-13 first-leg defeat at Central Park, Wigan on Saturday 13 May 1944, but Harry Royal played  in the 5-12 second-leg defeat at Crown Flatt, Dewsbury on Saturday 20 May 1944.

County League appearances
Tom Walsh played in Castleford's victory in the Yorkshire County League during the 1938–39 season.

References

External links
Search for "Walsh" at rugbyleagueproject.org
Search for "Tom Walsh" at britishnewspaperarchive.co.uk

Castleford Tigers players
Dewsbury Rams players
English rugby league players
Leigh Leopards players
Place of birth missing
Place of death missing
Rugby league halfbacks
Year of birth missing
Year of death missing